is a Japanese animation studio subsidiary of Twin Engine.

History
The company was established by producer Hideo Uda in 2011. The studio follows a principle  of "making a place where people involved in anime can continue to work peacefully and to contribute to the further development of Japanese animation culture". The "Colorido" in the studio's name translates to "rich in color" or "colorful" in Portuguese and Spanish.

Years later, the company entered a business partnership with company Twin Engine and became a subsidiary in the network, with Twin Engine CEO Kōji Yamamoto becoming co-CEO.

In April 2022, Studio Colorido signed a multi-year co-production deal with Netflix.

Works

Films
Typhoon Noruda (2015)
Penguin Highway (2018)
A Whisker Away (2020)
Burn the Witch (2020) (With team Yamahitsuji) 
Drifting Home (2022)
Untitled Tomotaka Shibayama film (2024)

Short films
Shashinkan (2013)
Hinata no Aoshigure (2013)
Wonder Garden (2013)
Paulette's Chair (2014)

Original net animation
Fastening Days (2014–2019)
Japan Animator Expo - Bubu & Bulbina (2015)
Pokémon: Twilight Wings (2020; #1, 3–8)
Pokétoon - A Budding Dream (2021)
Pokétoon - Wait Here, Magikarp! (2021)
Star Wars: Visions - Tatooine Rhapsody (2021)

References

External links
  
 

 
Animation studios in Tokyo
Japanese animation studios
Japanese companies established in 2011
Mass media companies established in 2011